The 2019–20 Boston College Eagles men's ice hockey team represented Boston College in the 2019–20 NCAA Division I men's ice hockey season. The team was coached by Jerry York, '67, his twenty-sixth season behind the bench at Boston College. The Eagles played their home games at Kelley Rink on the campus of Boston College, competing in Hockey East.

The Eagles competed in just one mid-season tournament during the 2019–20 season, forgoing the traditional holiday break tournament. The Eagles played in the 68th Annual Beanpot Tournament at the TD Garden in Boston, Massachusetts on February 3 and 10. Boston College faced Boston University in the opening round, where they officially tied 4–4 per NCAA rules, but the Terriers advanced to the championship game by scoring in the second overtime. The Eagles faced the Harvard Crimson in the consolation game, securing third place with a 7–2 victory. They failed to secure a Beanpot title for the fourth consecutive season, while Northeastern won their third consecutive title.

The Eagles finished the season 24–8–2, and 17–6–1 in conference play, to secure 1st place in Hockey East and the regular season title. The Hockey East tournament as well as the NCAA Tournament were unfortunately cancelled due to the COVID-19 pandemic, before any games were played. Therefore, no postseason result occurred for the Eagles.

Previous season recap

The Eagles entered the 2019–20 season following a 2018–19 effort falling well short of expectation. While they did advance to the Hockey East tournament championship game, they ultimately fell to the Northeastern Huskies and failed to secure a bid to the NCAA Tournament for a third straight season. Their regular season record was abysmal by recent standards, going only 14–22–3 and 10–11–3 in conference play, finishing seventh in the conference; their lowest result since 2008–09. Additionally, they failed to secure any mid-season tournament title, their only tournament result being their second place Beanpot finish.

Departures

Nine Eagles departed from the program from the 2018–19 roster: 

Graduation:

Michael Kim, Senior – D
Casey Fitzgerald, Senior – D
Christopher Brown, Senior – F
J.D. Dudek, Senior – F
Ian Milosz, Senior – G

Signed Professionally:
Joseph Woll, Junior – G (Toronto Maple Leafs) 
Oliver Wahlstrom, Freshman – F (New York Islanders) 

Not Retained:

Jacob Tortora, Sophomore – F (Signed with the Barrie Colts of the OHL) 
Christopher Grando, Sophomore – F (Transferred to Arizona State)

Recruiting
Boston College added eight freshmen for the 2019–20 season: three forwards, three defensemen, and two goalies.

Mid-season additions
Adin Farhat, Junior – G (Called up from the club hockey team)
Casey Carreau, Sophomore – F (Returned to the program after having been not retained following his freshman season in 2017–18. Played 44 combined games for the Des Moines Buccaneers and the Boston Junior Bruins in the USHL and USPHL, respectively.)

2019–2020 roster

2019–20 Eagles

As of March 3, 2020.

Coaching staff

Standings

Schedule

Regular season

|-
!colspan=12 ! style=""; | Exhibition

|-
!colspan=12 ! style=""; | Regular Season

|-
!colspan=12 style=""| Hockey East Tournament (Cancelled)
|-
!colspan=12 style=""| NCAA Tournament (Cancelled)

† In the opening round of the 2020 Beanpot tournament, Boston University and Boston College officially tied - per NCAA rules - after playing a scoreless 5-minute overtime. The game continued for placement purposes, where the Terriers advanced to the title game by scoring in the second overtime period.

Both the Hockey East and NCAA Tournaments were cancelled as a result of the Coronavirus pandemic, before any games were played. Boston College was scheduled to host Providence in the Quarterfinals of the Hockey East Tournament and was qualified to make the NCAA tournament.

Rankings

Statistics

Skaters

Goaltenders

Awards and honors

Tim Taylor Award
Alex Newhook, F – Winner, NCAA Rookie of the Year

Mike Richter Award
Spencer Knight, G – Top 10 Semifinalist, NCAA Goalie of the Year

USCHO Awards
Alex Newhook, F – Rookie of the Year

College Hockey News Awards
Alex Newhook, F – All-Rookie Team, Rookie of the Year
Spencer Knight, G – All-Rookie Team

Hockey East Awards
Alex Newhook, F – Rookie of the Year

Hockey East All-Stars
Alex Newhook, F – All-Rookie Team, All-Second Team
Matt Boldy, F – All-Rookie Team
Spencer Knight, G – All-Rookie Team, All-Second Team
Ben Finklestein, D – All-Second Team
Jesper Mattila, D – All-Third Team
David Cotton, F – All-Third Team

National Player of the Month
Alex Newhook, F – Month of February

National Rookie of the Month
Spencer Knight, G – Month of November 
Alex Newhook, F – Month of February

Hockey East Player of the Month
Alex Newhook, F – Month of February 

Hockey East Goaltender of the Month
Spencer Knight, G – Month of December

Hockey East Rookie of the Month
Spencer Knight, G – Month of November
Alex Newhook, F – Month of February 

Hockey East Player of the Week
David Cotton, F – Week of October 14, 2019
Spencer Knight, G – Week of December 9, 2019
Ron Greco, F – Week of January 6, 2020 (Shared with Tim Doherty, Maine)
Logan Hutsko, F – Week of January 20, 2020
Alex Newhook, F – Week of February 17, 2020

Hockey East Defensive Player of the Week
Spencer Knight, G – Week of February 3, 2020, Week of March 9, 2020

Hockey East Rookie of the Week
Spencer Knight, G – Week of October 14, 2019, Week of November 18, 2019, Week of March 2, 2020
Alex Newhook, F – Week of January 13, 2020, Week of February 10, 2020 (Shared with Zac Jones, Massachusetts), Week of February 24, 2020
Matt Boldy, F – Week of February 17, 2020

Players drafted into the NHL

2020 NHL Entry Draft

† incoming freshman

References

External links
BC Men's Hockey Home Page
BC Men's Hockey Page on USCHO

Boston College Eagles men's ice hockey seasons
Boston College Eagles
Boston College Eagles
Boston College Eagles men's ice hockey season
Boston College Eagles men's ice hockey season
Boston College Eagles men's ice hockey season
Boston College Eagles men's ice hockey season